Saint Blues Guitar Workshop is a Memphis, Tennessee manufacturer of boutique electric guitars.  The company was born out of the custom guitar division of Strings & Things Music store in Memphis, but originally only lasted for a five-year run in the 1980s.  After a 16-year hiatus, the company was rejuvenated by Memphis investors and is now making quality electric guitars similar to the likes of Tom Keckler and James Tyler.

The guitars have nitro-cellulose binding (front & back on the Bluesmaster), unique shapes, and a recognizable headstock shape.

History

Early Years
Saint Blues Guitars was founded in Memphis by Tom (TK) Keckler, Charles Lawing, and Chris Lovell . The "Bluesmaster" body was first designed at the Strings and Things music store, built from a Fender Telecaster that Keckler was looking to modify.

In 1978, Keckler joined Schecter Guitar Research to make custom one-off guitars that would show off the Schecter components.  The resulting guitars not only showed the quality of the components, but eventually helped move Schecter from a parts supplier to a full guitar manufacturer.  In 1983, Keckler moved back to Memphis to continue his guitar work. With his connections to Schecter, Keckler helped form Saint Blues Guitars with the owners of Strings & Things in 1984.  The first Saint Blues model - the Bluesmaster - was that body shape that TK had created some years prior.

Collapse
Saint Blues guitars quickly got into the hands of Dana Key, Mylon LeFevre, Eric Clapton, Bono, Albert King, Rick Derringer, Elliot Easton, Marshall Crenshaw, Glenn Frey, Billy Gibbons and more.  In five years Saint Blues had made over 2,500 instruments, but the company was shut down in 1989 due to the economic climate, the increasing value of the yen vs. the dollar, sliding sales, and the desire of Strings & Things to move their focus back to sales and services.

Rebirth
With brand loyalty still very high and vintage models appreciating in value, a private group relaunched Saint Blues in 2005 under a corporate holding company called Legendary Gear, with Tom Keckler behind the design and quality control.  The company had a Pro Series built in Korea (sharing a manufacturer with Gretsch) and a Workshop Series built in the USA.  All Saint Blues guitars have been finished and set up in Memphis. 

They made a number standard guitar models, a bass guitar (The King Blues) and a wide array of custom creations including the Andrew Wells VanWyngarden (of MGMT) Signature Model. The Memphis Rock N' Soul Museum has a permanent exhibit to honor the 25th anniversary of the creation of Saint Blues Guitar Workshops.

The Present
Since 2011, the company has turned its focus solely to the Workshop Series - all handmade in the USA, designed, assembled, and set up in Memphis, Tennessee.  Saint Blues makes four models of electric guitar and various cigar box guitars.

The facility has vintage Saint Blues models on display, with current models in a showroom that includes a large mural detailing company history.  A visitor can sit at the 'Whammy Bar' and watch them making the guitars.

Instruments

Workshop Series

The workshop series feature guitars of the finest quality with a vintage nitro finish. All workshop series guitars are available with Brent Lollar pickups or Lindy Fralin pickups.
"Bluesmaster" - The original
"61 South" - a hollow body version
"Mississippi Bluesmaster" - dual splittable Humbucker pickup version
"Blindsider" - Alternate body style

Juke Joint Series 

The Juke Joint series offers a more affordable high-quality made-in-Memphis guitar. All Juke Joints feature a satin finish, Kent Armstrong pickups and are available in many different colors.
"Bluesmaster" - The original, tele-style guitar
"Mississippi Bluesmaster" - Available with either splittable humbuckers or tapped P90's.

Cigar Box Guitars
"4 String" - tuned in Open G
"3 String" - tuned in Open G

Gallery

References

External links 
 Saint Blues Official Site
 Saint Blues Official MySpace
 Saint Blues Facebook
 Saint Blues 2011 Catalog
 61 South Review
NAMM Oral History Interview with Tom Keckler January 7, 2009

Guitar manufacturing companies of the United States
Manufacturing companies based in Memphis, Tennessee